Wan Roslan bin Wan Hamat is a Malaysian politician who has served as Member of the Kelantan State Executive Council (EXCO) under Menteri Besar Ahmad Yakob and Member of the Kelantan State Legislative Assembly (MLA) for Pengkalan Kubor since May 2018. He is a member of the Malaysian Islamic Party (PAS), a component party of the ruling Perikatan Nasional (PN) coalition.

Personal life 
At 6.55 pm in the evening on 16 July 2022, the wife of Wan Roslan namely Wan Norihan Wan Abdul Rahman passed away at the Universiti Sains Malaysia Hospital (HUSM) at the age of 54. Anas Karimi Ahmad, the special officer to Wan Roslan confirmed and explained this on the same day. According to Anas Karimi, Wan Norihan had a heart condition and only underwent a coronary bypass at a private hospital not long before. Shortly after Hari Raya Aidilfitri, Wan Norihan suffered from fluids in her lungs and was in the intensive care unit (ICU) of a private hospital for 26 days before being transferred to HUSM. He also informed that Wan Norihan was to be buried in Kampung Kutan at night on the same day.

Election results

References

Malaysian Islamic Party politicians
Members of the Kelantan State Legislative Assembly
Kelantan state executive councillors
21st-century Malaysian politicians
Living people
People from Kelantan
Malaysian people of Malay descent
Malaysian Muslims
1966 births